Benedikt Schopper (born February 18, 1985) is a German professional ice hockey defenceman currently playing for the Deggendorfer SC in the Oberliga (Ger.3).

Playing career
Schopper previously joined ERC Ingolstadt from EHC Wolfsburg on a one-year contract on April 16, 2013. After his fifth season playing with ERC Ingolstadt in 2017–18, Schopper concluded his contract and joined his fifth DEL club, agreeing to a one-year deal with the Straubing Tigers on March 28, 2018.

Career statistics

International

References

External links

1985 births
Essen Mosquitoes players
Fischtown Pinguins players
German ice hockey defencemen
Hannover Scorpions players
ERC Ingolstadt players
Krefeld Pinguine players
Living people
Straubing Tigers players
Grizzlys Wolfsburg players
People from Weiden in der Oberpfalz
Sportspeople from the Upper Palatinate